The 1999 USA Outdoor Track and Field Championships took place between June 24–27 at Hayward Field in Eugene, Oregon. The competition acted as a way of selecting the United States team for the 1999 World Championships in Athletics in Seville, Spain August 20–29 later that year.

Results

Men track events

Men field events

Women track events

Women field events

Byes
American athletes with byes to the 1999 Championships as 1997 Champions:
 Maurice Greene 100 meters and he repeated as 1999 World Champion
 Michael Johnson 400 meters and he repeated as 1999 World Champion
 Allen Johnson 110 meters hurdles  Because Johnson competed and was in a qualifying position, 4th place Duane Ross was selected to the World Championships where he won a bronze medal
 John Godina Shot put  Because Godina competed and was in a qualifying position, 4th place Andy Bloom was selected to the World Championships
 Marion Jones 100 meters and she repeated as 1999 World Champion.  Unlike her Olympic medals the following year, this result has not been disqualified due to her admission of taking performance enhancing drugs, part of the BALCO scandal

See also
United States Olympic Trials (track and field)

References

 results

USA Outdoor Track and Field Championships
Usa Outdoor Track And Field Championships, 1999
Track and field
1999 in sports in Oregon
Track and field in Oregon